Angelica Burevik Törnqvist (born 7 December 1958) is a Swedish former association football defender who won 30 caps for the Sweden women's national football team. She is nicknamed Agge.

Club career
Burevik's performances for local team Stattena IF earned her a place in the Helsingborgs Idrottsmuseum Hall of Fame in 1983. She later served the club as chairperson.

International career
Burevik made her senior Sweden debut in a 6–1 win over France in Montauban on 23 May 1981. She won the first UEFA championships for national women's teams in 1984. Sweden beat England in the final, on a penalty shootout at Kenilworth Road after a 1–1 aggregate draw. Burevik's break down the right wing and cross had created Pia Sundhage's headed goal for Sweden in the first leg at Ullevi. Her exertions in central defence on the muddy Kenilworth Road pitch left her too exhausted to participate in the shootout.

Burevik played 30 games in a row for Sweden, the last of which was on 9 October 1985. Only two games were lost while 22 resulted in Swedish victories.

References

Living people
1958 births
Swedish women's footballers
Sweden women's international footballers
Sportspeople from Helsingborg
Women's association football defenders
UEFA Women's Championship-winning players